This is an incomplete list of festivals that take place in the state of North Carolina, and have an article on Wikipedia.

Food
Lexington Barbecue Festival
North Carolina Potato Festival
North Carolina Watermelon Festival
Roanoke-Chowan Pork-Fest

Beverage
North Carolina Wine Festival
Yadkin Valley Wine Festival

Music
Brevard Music Center
The End of Summer Weenie Roast
MerleFest
Moogfest (music, art and technology, see Moog synthesizer)
Mount Airy Fiddlers Convention
Predmestky Festival
Shakori Hills Grassroots Festival (music and dance)
Sparkcon
Hopscotch Music Festival

Film
100 Words Film Festival
ActionFest
Full Frame Documentary Film Festival
North Carolina Gay & Lesbian Film Festival
National Black Theatre Festival
North Carolina Black Film Festival
North Carolina School of the Arts Summer Performance Festival (drama, music, dance and, film as well)
Real to Reel International Film Festival
RiverRun International Film Festival

Dance
American Dance Festival
Wake Forest Dance Festival

Art
Artsplosure
Bele Chere (defunct, music and street arts)
Brushy Mountain Apple Festival (arts and crafts)
Transformus (regional "Burning Man" art festival)

Other
Animazement (anime)
Aniwave (anime)
Apple Chill
Carolina Renaissance Festival
Fayetteville Dogwood Festival (musics, arts and crafts, art, educational)
Halloween on Franklin Street
John Canoe (influenced by the Fancy Dress Festival)
LEAF Festival (instructive, performing arts)
North Carolina Azalea Festival
North Carolina Comedy Arts Festival
North Carolina Science Festival
Wild Goose Festival (focuses on justice, spirituality, music and the arts)
Woolly Worm Festival (celebrating the supposed weather-predicting abilities of the woolly worm)

See also
List of festivals in the United States
Barbecue in North Carolina

References

Tourist attractions in North Carolina
Festivals in North Carolina
Events in North Carolina
North Carolina culture
North Carolina